Oberalberting (also known as Alberting) is a populated place in Upper Austria, Austria. It is a village (Ortschaft) in Pfaffing in Vöcklabruck District. As of 1 January 2019, population was 120.

See also
Fornach

References

Cities and towns in Vöcklabruck District